Aethiopsestis is a genus of moths belonging to the subfamily Thyatirinae of the Drepanidae.

Species
 Aethiopsestis austrina Watson, 1965
 Aethiopsestis echinata Watson, 1965
 Aethiopsestis mufindiae Watson, 1965

References

Thyatirinae
Drepanidae genera